Chauncey Hardy (May 15, 1988 – October 9, 2011) was an American professional basketball player. He played for CSS Giurgiu in the Divizia A, the top-tier professional basketball league of Romania. He died on October 9, 2011 in the Romanian city of Giurgiu, where he was severely beaten in a nightclub following an altercation with a group of men.  Hardy arrived comatose in hospital and died following surgery. Before his death he had 3 heart attacks.  A day later, a man was arrested after he surrendered to police. He was put in custody pending the trial.

Chauncey, a native of Middletown, Connecticut, previously played basketball for Sacred Heart University in Fairfield, Connecticut.

References

1988 births
2011 deaths
African-American basketball players
American expatriate basketball people in Romania
American people murdered abroad
Basketball players from Connecticut
Deaths by beating in Europe
Male murder victims
People murdered in Romania
Point guards
Sacred Heart Pioneers men's basketball players
Sportspeople from Middletown, Connecticut
American men's basketball players
20th-century African-American people
21st-century African-American sportspeople
Murdered African-American people